The Alexiad is a medieval historical and biographical text written around the year 1148, by the Byzantine princess Anna Komnene, daughter of Emperor Alexios I Komnenos. It was written in a form of artificial Attic Greek. Anna described the political and military history of the Byzantine Empire during the reign of her father, thus providing a significant account on the Byzantium of the High Middle Ages. Among other topics, the Alexiad documents the Byzantine Empire's interaction with the Crusades and highlights the conflicting perceptions of the East and West in the early 12th century. It does not mention the schism of 1054 – a topic which is very common in contemporary writing. Nevertheless it successfully documents firsthand the decline of Byzantine cultural influence in both eastern and western Europe, particularly in the West's increasing involvement in its geographic sphere.

Structure
The book is divided into 15 books and a prologue. Its scope is limited to the duration of Alexios' reign, which it is thus able to depict in full detail, especially regarding political relations between the Byzantine Empire and western European powers. 

1. Attacks against the Byzantine empire by the Normans, under their leader Robert Guiscard (Books 1–6):

Book 1 addresses Alexios' becoming general and Domestikos ton Scholon. It also discusses the Normans' preparation for their invasion. Book 2 addresses the Komnenian revolt. Book 3 addresses Alexios as Emperor (1081), the internal problems with Doukas family, and the Normans' crossing the Adriatic Sea. Book 4 addresses war against the Normans (1081–1082). Book 5 also addresses war against the Normans (1082–1083), and their first clash with the "heretics". Book 6 addresses the end of war against the Normans (1085) and the death of Robert Guiscard.

2. Byzantine relations with the Turks (Books 6–7, 9–10, and 14–15):

Book 7 addresses war against the Scythians (1087–1090). Book 9 addresses operations against Tzachas and the Dalmatians (1092–1094), and the conspiracy of Nicephorus Diogenes (1094). Book 10 addresses war against the Cumans and the beginning of the First Crusade (1094–1097). Book 14 addresses Turks, Franks, Cumans, and Manicheans (1108–1115). Book 15 addresses the last expeditions — The Bogomils — Death of Alexios (1116–1118).

3. Pecheneg incursions on the northern Byzantine frontier (Books 7–8):

Book 8 addresses the end of the Scythian war (1091) and plots against the Emperor.

4. The First Crusade and Byzantine reactions to it (Books 10–11):

Book 11 also addresses the First Crusade (1097–1104).

5. Attacks on Byzantine frontiers by Robert Guiscard's son, Bohemond I of Antioch (Books 11–13)

Book 12 addresses domestic conflicts and the Norman preparation for their second invasion (1105–1107). Book 13 addresses Aaron's conspiracy and the second Norman invasion (1107–1108).

Themes
The main theme of the Alexiad is the First Crusade, and religious conflict. Anna Komnene chronicles the different groups of people involved in the crusades, and refers to them as "Celts", "Latins", and "Normans". She also talks about her father, Alexios Komnenos in great detail, and his conquests throughout his rule from 1081–1118. She does this by presenting a "Byzantine view" of the Crusades. Some historians have noticed the influence of Greek mythology in her work, as stated by Lenora Neville: "the characterization of Alexios as wily sea captain steering the empire through constant storms with guile and courage strongly recalls Odysseus."

Narrative style
The Alexiad was originally written in Greek in around 1148, and first edited by Possinus in 1651. Anna Komnene described herself in the text and openly acknowledges her feelings and opinions for some events, which goes against the typical format of historiography. She differed widely from Greek prose historians, and because of this the book was initially well received. It was subjected to criticism later. The Alexiad interests many historians because Anna wrote it in a different format to the norm of the time. Anna Komnene is the only female Greek historiographer of her era, and historians are keen to believe that her style of writing owes much to her being a woman. Despite including herself in the historiography and the other qualities that make her style vastly different from the typical historiography of the era, Anna Komnene's Alexiad has been seen as a "straightforward" history.

Influences
Anna Komnene's writings are a major source of information on her father, Alexios I of the Byzantine Empire. She was around the age of 55 when she began work on the Alexiad. While she was alive, she held the crusaders that came to her father's aid in contempt for their actions against the Empire after they looted various reconquests and failed to return to the Basileus' demesne many of the lands they promised to return to him. She regarded the crusaders, whom she refers to as Celts, Latins and Normans, as uneducated barbarians. Despite this, Anna claims that she portrayed them in a neutral light. Some historians believe her work to be biased because of her feelings towards the Crusaders, and how highly she regarded her father.

Bias 
Anna Komnene stated her intention to record true events, but issues of bias do exist. Emphasis on Alexios as a "specifically Christian emperor", and a moral as well as politically laudable one, is pervasive. Frankopan compares Alexios' treatment in the text to the techniques of the hagiographical tradition, while contrasting it with the negative portrait of, or the outright absence of, his successors John II and Manuel I. Anna discussed the Latins (Normans and "Franks"), whom she described as barbarians. This distaste extends to the Turks and Armenians. The Alexiad also criticized John II Komnenos for his accession to the throne (in place of Anna herself) following Alexios' death. From a modern reader's point of view, the inconsistencies in the descriptions of military events and the Empire's misfortunes (partially due to these literary and especially Homeric influences) may seem exaggerated and stereotypical. Despite these issues, George Ostrogorsky emphasizes the importance of the Alexiad as a primary document.

Gender and authorship

Questions of authorship
There has been much debate as to whether the Alexiad was in fact written by Anna Komnene herself. One scholar stated that the text gives very few comments that would suggest the author's gender or any other aspect of their background, aside from a few explicit mentions. This has led some scholars to argue that the Alexiad was not written by a woman at all, but by some other male author. This belief, put forward by Howard-Johnston, focuses mainly on the military sections of the Alexiad, and suggests that Anna was merely working from her husband's field notes, thus Howard-Johnston renames it "Nicephoros's Alexiad."

It is largely agreed, however, that Anna Komnene was the author. Mentions in the text of her engagement, her role as a wife, and the commentary on her female modesty that influences her writing make Anna's authorship of the Alexiad "unmistakable", according to some scholars. She certainly could have written about military affairs, since she was able to accompany her father, the emperor, on military campaigns. Many scholars believe that the great detail about her father's home life and military style, combined with her own personal experiences and mentions of femininity, provide a strong case for her authorship of the Alexiad.

Representations of gender
In the Alexiad, Anna Komnene portrays gender and gender stereotypes in an unusual way. Like her male counterparts, she characterizes women along the typical stereotypes, such as being "liable to tears and as cowardly in the face of danger". Despite this, women in the Alexiad never cry, with the exception of Alexios' funeral, during which grief is the appropriate cultural response. Likewise, none of the female characters act in a cowardly way. She points to her own gender in a similar way when mentioning her own tears while writing certain events. Immediately, however, she informs the reader that she will stop crying in order to properly return to her duty of history, an episode which she repeats twice in the narrative. By so doing, she shows a desire to control aspects that are, for her culture, feminine. Overall, however, Anna concerns herself primarily with intellect, which she attributes to both men and women, and allows for women to actively break out of societal gender roles in the Alexiad. Her personal attitudes, along with the lack of comparable sources from female authors in that era, make the Alexiad considered by some a poor source to use when gauging how average women in Byzantium felt about the First Crusade.

Gender and style
Anna Komnene's  unusual style of writing history has been attributed to her gender. Her style is noteworthy in that it included both a history of her father's actions during the First Crusade, and her reactions to some of these events. Her opinions and commentary on particular events in an otherwise historical text have been assigned to her gender both positively and negatively. This interpretation of her histories is known as a "gendered history", meaning it is both the history of Alexios and of Anna herself through her particular style, which is not seen in male authors. While the Roman historian Edward Gibbon saw this "gendered" narrative to betray "in every page the vanity of a female author", with some scholars agreeing with him, other scholars claim that this style might be indicative of Anna's mentor, Michael Psellos. Some take this even further to suggest that Anna used Psellos' Chronographia as a model for her personal narration in her history and took his style even further, suggesting it was not her gender but her influences that led to her writing style.

Anna Komnene is considered unique for her time in the intensity by which she integrates her own narrative and emotion, and yet she does not mention all personal details, such as the fact that she had four children. For some, this combination of style and lack of personal, gendered information is reconciled by her lack of modern feminist ideals, without which she was not interested in questioning her societal place in her own narrative, even though her depictions of women do not fit in with the majority of male authors of the time. Instead, her style can be understood from her belief that intelligence and nobility are far greater than gender in terms of importance, and so Anna does not view her history as overstepping any necessary gender roles.

Complete manuscripts and summaries
Below is the list of manuscripts containing some or all of the Alexiad.

Codex Coislinianus 311, in Fonds Coislin (Paris)
Codex Florentinus 70,2
Codex Vaticanus Graecus 1438
Codex Barberinianus 235 & 236
Codex Ottobonianus Graecus 131 & 137
Codex Apographum Gronovii
Codex Vaticanus Graecus 981 (prologue and summary)
Codex Monacensis Graecus 355 (prologue and summary)
Codex Parisinus Graecus 400 (prologue and summary)

Published editions

See also

 Byzantine Empire
 First Crusade
 Attic Greek
 I, Anna Komnene

Notes

References
 
 .
 .
 .
 .
 .
 .
 .
 .
 .
 .
 .
 .
 .
 .
 .

1140s books
12th-century history books
Texts about the Crusades
Byzantine literature
Alexios I Komnenos
First Crusade
Epic poems in Greek